Jamaica competed at the 2022 World Aquatics Championships in Budapest, Hungary from 17 June to 3 July.

Diving

Jamaica has entered one diver.

Men

Swimming

Jamaica has entered two swimmers.

Men

References

Nations at the 2022 World Aquatics Championships
Jamaica at the World Aquatics Championships
2022 in Jamaican sport